The Accomplices is a 2007 play  by New York Times reporter  Bernard Weinraub.  It  premiered at The New Group in New York City in 2007 and played thereafter in regional theatres.

The play is based on Hillel Kook's wartime experiences in the United States.   The role of Hillel Kook (aka "Peter Bergson") was played twice onstage by actor Steven Schub (lead singer of The Fenwicks), in 2008 at The Fountain Theatre and in 2009 at the Odyssey Theatre in Los Angeles. Raphael Poch  played Bergson at a 2009 production in Jerusalem and David Golinkin played Rabbi Wise.

References

2007 plays
American plays
Jewish theatre
Plays set in the United States
Plays about World War II
Biographical plays about military leaders